Ana Paula Rodrigues (born 20 January 1988) is a Brazilian gymnast. She competed at the 2004 Summer Olympics.

References

External links
 

1988 births
Living people
Brazilian female artistic gymnasts
Olympic gymnasts of Brazil
Gymnasts at the 2004 Summer Olympics
Sportspeople from Curitiba
Pan American Games medalists in gymnastics
Pan American Games bronze medalists for Brazil
Gymnasts at the 2003 Pan American Games
21st-century Brazilian women
20th-century Brazilian women